Admiral Sir Peter Richards KCB (1787 – 16 March 1869) was a Royal Navy officer who went on to be Third Sea Lord.

Naval career

Richards joined the Royal Navy in 1798. Promoted to Captain in 1828, Richards was given command of HMS Asia and HMS Volage before commanding HMS Cornwallis in the First Opium War. He later commanded HMS Hibernia, HMS Royal Sovereign, HMS Cumberland and HMS Boscawen.

As a rear-admiral he was appointed Third Sea Lord in 1854 and served in that role during the Crimean War. He was promoted vice-admiral on the Reserved List in April, 1862.

St. Peter's Memorial Mission Chapel at Saltash Passage near St Budeaux in Cornwall was built in his memory but damaged in World War II and then demolished in 1956.

He is buried at  St Andrew's Church, Ham, Surrey.

See also

References

1787 births
1869 deaths
Knights Commander of the Order of the Bath
Royal Navy admirals
Lords of the Admiralty
Burials at St Andrew's Church, Ham